True Colors was an annual music event created by American recording artist Cyndi Lauper. The concerts were headlined by Lauper and featured various music and comedy acts. Beginning in 2007, the trek supported the Human Rights Campaign, PFLAG and the Matthew Shepard Foundation. Other local and private LGBT charities and foundations were supported as the event grew. The tour began with 16 shows in 2007 expanding to 25 shows in 2008.  Lauper's set during the 2008 tour was basically the North American leg of her worldwide Bring Ya to the Brink Tour that year.  An outing in 2009 was planned and later cancelled. In lieu of the tour, Lauper partnered with Broadway Impact to create the True Colors Cabaret. The show began September 28, 2009 and ran once a month at Feinstein's at Loews Regency. It featured performances from Lauper, Rufus Wainwright, Lea Michele, Jonathan Groff, Jason Mraz, Sara Bareilles, Karen Olivo, Melinda Doolittle and Broadway Inspirational Voices. The shows ran until February 2010.

Background
Logo TV was one of the partnering sponsors for the music festival. The channel aired a half-hour special on June 21, 2007 titled Shining Through: Behind the Scenes of True Colors. The special was hosted by Cho at the MGM Grand in Las Vegas, Nevada. During the special, Lauper explained the purpose of the True Colors Tour: 
 
The HRC received $1 from each ticket sold throughout the tour. The theme of the tour was about eliminating hate, specifically about getting the Matthew Shepard Act passed by the U.S. Senate. In October 2007, the US Congress approved the Matthew Shepard Act, accomplishing one of the goals of the tour. In 2008 True Colors tour visited 23 cities across North America with a cast of acts that was even more impressive than the previous year. The shows featured up to eight marquee names per night with several collaborations and an encore featuring every act on stage together.

Line up

2007
Headliners
Cyndi Lauper
Debbie Harry
Erasure

Support acts
Cazwell
Amanda Lepore 
Rosie O'Donnell
The B-52's
The Dresden Dolls
Diana Yanez
Rufus Wainwright
The Gossip
The Cliks
Indigo Girls

Hosted by Margaret Cho

2008
Headliners
Cyndi Lauper
The B-52's
Joan Jett & The Blackhearts

Support acts

Indigo Girls
Andy Bell
Girl in a Coma
Regina Spektor
Tegan and Sara
Colton Ford
Kat DeLuna
The White Tie Affair
DJ Paul V
Joan Armatrading

Deborah Cox
The Cliks
The Puppini Sisters
Nona Hendryx
Sarah McLachlan
Lili Haydn 
Margaret Cho
Rosie O'Donnell
Wanda Sykes
Kate Clinton 

Hosted by Carson Kressley

Setlist

Tour dates

Box office score data

Broadcasts and recordings

A True Colors commemorative album was released on June 12, 2007 through Tommy Boy Records. Physical copies were for sale at the concerts and the album was also available online from the iTunes Store. A reissue commemorative album was again released through the iTunes Store and was available for free download by concert attendees.

References

External links
The New York Times review of the show at the Radio City Music Hall on June 18, 2007

2007 concert tours
2007 in LGBT history
2008 concert tours
2008 in LGBT history
Cyndi Lauper concert tours
LGBT-related music events